Tsehaiwork Darge was the daughter of Ras Darge Sahle Selassie, Prince of Selale, and granddaughter of Sahle Selassie, King of Shewa from 1813 to 1847. 

Tsehaiwork was favored by her first cousin Emperor Menelik II and his wife Taytu Betul. 

She never formally married, but instead administered her vast land holdings by herself and allegedly had a male "favorite." She was a formidable and headstrong woman who was greatly feared as a taskmaster by the domestic staff of her father's household and of the Imperial Palace. 

She helped nurse Emperor Menelik during his long final illness, virtually running the Imperial Palace during those times that Empress Taytu herself was ill. 

She was also close to the next two rulers of Ethiopia, Iyasu V and Empress Zewditu, although she fell into disfavor under Emperor Haile Selassie and was convicted of plotting to overthrow him in favor of Iyasu. 

Tsehaiwork was then confined to her estates at Selale where she lived out her days.

She had an affair with 'obbo Wako' who was a ruler of "Ginda sheno wako" of Degem, Selale, latter Dejazmach (general) of Selale cavalries at the battle of Adwa. She gave birth to her first son Nigussie, later Basha, who served King Hailesilase as head of cavalries at the battle of Maichew under the command of ras kasa woizero. Dinkinesh Asfaw Nigussie is the fourth generation of Ras darge from woizero  tsehaiwork Darge side.

Ethiopian princesses
Ethiopian Royal Family